Marktsteft is a town in the district of Kitzingen, in Bavaria, Germany.

It was the birthplace (1885) of the well-known Second World War general Albert Kesselring.

References

External links
 Coat of arms of Marktsteft

Kitzingen (district)